Elizabeth Mitchell (born Elizabeth Joanna Robertson; March 27, 1970) is an American actress. She is best known for her lead role as Juliet Burke on the ABC mystery drama series Lost (2006–2010), for which she received a Primetime Emmy Award nomination. Mitchell also had lead roles on the television series V (2009–2010), Revolution (2012–2014), Dead of Summer (2016), and The Santa Clauses (2022–present). She had recurring roles on the television series ER (2000–2001), Once Upon a Time (2014), The Expanse (2018, 2021), and Outer Banks (2021–present).

Mitchell is also known for her roles in numerous films, including Gia (1998), Frequency (2000), Nurse Betty (2000), The Santa Clause 2 (2002), The Santa Clause 3: The Escape Clause (2006), Running Scared (2006), Answers to Nothing (2011), The Purge: Election Year (2016), and Queen Bees (2021).

Early life
Mitchell was born in Los Angeles, California. Her stepfather, Joseph Day Mitchell, and mother, Josephine Marian Mitchell (née Jenkins), are lawyers based in Dallas. Mitchell and her mother moved to Dallas in 1970, where her mother married Joseph Mitchell in 1975. Mitchell graduated from Booker T. Washington High School for the Performing and Visual Arts, a public magnet school. She is the eldest of three sisters, the others being Kristina Helen "Kristie" Mitchell and Katherine Day "Kate" Mitchell.

She attended Stephens College, graduating with a bachelor of fine arts in acting, and then studied at the British American Drama Academy.

Career

Mitchell's theatre work includes six years at Dallas Theater Center and a season at Encore Theater. She had an early TV role as Dinah Lee on the soap opera Loving from 1994 to 1995. She co-starred in the 1998 movie Gia and the 2000 movie Frequency.

In the 2002 film The Santa Clause 2, Mitchell played Carol Newman, who becomes Mrs. Claus. She reprised the role for the sequel The Santa Clause 3: The Escape Clause, released in 2006. A limited series based on the film was launched on Disney+ in 2022, with Mitchell reprising her character in the series.

On TV, she played psychiatrist Kim Legaspi, the first woman partner of Kerry Weaver during the 2000–2001 season of TV series ER, in a recurring role. She also had a one-episode role in House M.D. as a patient.

In 2006, she played Juliet Burke on Lost, beginning in the third-season premiere, a role she played for four seasons, three as a main character and one in a recurring capacity.

In March 2009, Mitchell was cast in the ABC series V, a remake of the science-fiction television miniseries. Although ABC and Warner Bros. officials said she was only cast as a guest star, the announcement led to speculation and concern that Mitchell's character would be killed off at the end of Lost's fifth season, which ended on a cliff-hanger that left the fate of her character unknown. Mitchell was later named the lead actress on V and her character was indeed written out in the premiere of the sixth season of Lost, but returned for the two-part series finale. V lasted for one more season, which premiered on January 4, 2011.

Mitchell had a guest-starring role on Law & Order: Special Victims Unit in 2011, portraying June Frye. In 2012, she joined the cast of the series Revolution as Rachel Matheson, replacing actress Andrea Roth. The series premiered on September 17, 2012 and ended in May 2014. She then recurred as the Snow Queen on the TV fantasy series Once Upon a Time in late 2014.

In 2016, Mitchell starred as U.S. senator Charlene "Charlie" Roan in the science-fiction horror film The Purge: Election Year. Also that year, it was announced Mitchell would join the main cast of the Freeform supernatural horror series Dead of Summer, portraying Deb Carpenter. The series ended after one season.

In 2018, Mitchell played Anna Volovodov on season three of The Expanse. She made a cameo in the third episode of the final season of the series in 2021.

Also in 2021, she appeared in the film Queen Bees and the second season of the Netflix series Outer Banks.

In 2022, she joined FBI: International in the recurring role of Angela Cassidy, a government agent and the long-missing mother of main character Scott Forrester.

In 2022, she reprised her role as Mrs. Claus in the new Disney+ series The Santa Clauses.

Personal life
While filming The Linda McCartney Story in 2000, Mitchell and co-star Gary Bakewell began dating and later became engaged, but the relationship ended in 2002.

Mitchell married improvisation actor Chris Soldevilla in 2004 and the two lived together in Bainbridge Island, Washington, with their son, who was born in 2005.

Filmography

Film

Television

Stage

Awards and nominations
Mitchell has won the Saturn Award for Best Supporting Actress on Television in 2008, among other nominations. For her appearance as Juliet Burke on the series finale of Lost, Mitchell was nominated for the Primetime Emmy Award for Outstanding Guest Actress in a Drama Series in 2010.

References

External links
 
 

Actresses from Texas
American film actresses
American soap opera actresses
American television actresses
American stage actresses
Living people
People from Dallas
Actresses from Los Angeles
Stephens College alumni
20th-century American actresses
21st-century American actresses
Alumni of the British American Drama Academy
1970 births